The chestnut-crowned bush warbler (Cettia major) is a species of warbler found in South Asia.
Although overall population size has not been quantified, this is one of the species that is declining due to habitat destruction. Although its population trend is observed to be decreasing, its decline is not happening in rapid fashion. For this reason, this is evaluated as least concern species.

References

chestnut-crowned bush warbler
Birds of North India
Birds of Nepal
Birds of Northeast India
Birds of Central China
chestnut-crowned bush warbler